The 18th Democratic Party of Japan presidential election was held on January 18, 2015. The election was held to replace outgoing president Banri Kaieda who resigned after losing his seat in the December 2014 general election. Acting president Katsuya Okada won the election after two rounds of voting, returning to the position he held from 2004 until 2005.

Candidates 
3 candidates ran in the leadership election:
Goshi Hosono, former secretary general of the DPJ.
Katsuya Okada, ex-party president (2004–05) and Minister of Foreign Affairs (2009–10).
Akira Nagatsuma, former health, labor and welfare minister.

Results

1st round 

This is the first time that the local councillors and members votes outweigh the caucus votes in a DPJ presidential election. In order to win, a candidate must obtain more than 50% of the points. Each caucus (consisting of DPJ Diet members) member vote carry 2 points. A prospective candidate for the 2016 House of Councillors election was also allowed to vote, with his vote carrying 1 point. Local and regional DPJ councillors altogether carried 141 points, while rank-and-file supporters and members accounted for 354 votes or almost a half of total 760 points. Turnout among supporters and members was recorded at 46.21% and 90.06% of councillors participated in the voting.

As no candidates obtained a majority in the 1st round, the election headed to a runoff between the top two candidates, Hosono and Okada.

2nd round 

In the runoff, only the caucus and the prospective 2016 candidate were voting.

Katsuya Okada garnered 133 points in the 2nd round, winning the election.

References

External links 
 Democratic Party: Past elections for the party presidency
 The Senkyo, election dictionary: Democratic Party presidential elections

2015 elections in Japan
Political party leadership elections in Japan
Indirect elections
January 2015 events in Japan
Democratic Party (Japan, 1998) leadership election